Wortham Center may refer to:

 Wortham Theater Center, a performing arts center in Houston, Texas
 Wortham Center for the Performing Arts, a performing arts center in Asheville, North Carolina